The 2010 SEAT León Eurocup was the third season of the SEAT León Eurocup, a one-make racing series supporting the World Touring Car Championship.

Teams and drivers

Race calendar and results
 A calendar was announced by the series on 17 December 2009. An FIA press release confirmed three dates the following day.

Championship standings

 Half points were awarded for the second race at Brands Hatch as a result of an accident involving Francisco Carvalho on the seventh lap.

References

External links
 

SEAT León Eurocup seasons
SEAT Leon Eurocup
SEAT Leon Eurocup